The 1975 St. Louis Tennis Classic, also known as the St. Louis WCT, was a men's professional tennis tournament that was part of the Blue Group of the 1975 World Championship Tennis circuit. It was played on indoor carpet courts at the Kiel Auditorium in St. Louis, Missouri in the United States. It was the fifth edition of the tournament and was held from April 7 through April 13, 1975. Fourth-seeded Vitas Gerulaitis won the singles title and earned $12,000 first-prize money.

Finals

Singles
 Vitas Gerulaitis defeated  Roscoe Tanner 2–6, 6–2, 6–3
 It was Gerulaitis' 2nd and last singles title of the year and the 3rd of his career.

Doubles
 Colin Dibley /  Ray Ruffels defeated  Ross Case /  Geoff Masters 6–4, 6–4

References

External links
 ITF tournament edition details

Tennis in Missouri
1975 in American tennis